Adamu Mohammed (born July 24, 1983, in Accra) is a Ghanaian football defender currently playing for Hapoel Be'er Sheva.

Club career
Mohammed is a tall defender who was signed in 2006 by Asante Kotoko from Real Sportive. In July 2008, he moved to Gençlerbirliği S.K. for a club record transfer fee of €4.5 million. In 2008, he went to Hacettepespor and in late 2008 he was loaned to KS Vllaznia Shkodër in Albania. In January 2009, he left Macedonia to sign with Tema Youth on loan from Hacettepespor and in September 2009 was sold to Eleven Wise. In 2010, he played for Hapoel Be'er Sheva.

International career 
Mohammed was part of the Ghana national under-23 side that won bronze at the 203 All-African Games in Abuja.

References

External links
 Adamu Mohammed at GhanaWeb
 
 

1983 births
Living people
Ghanaian footballers
Ghanaian expatriate footballers
Asante Kotoko S.C. players
Gençlerbirliği S.K. footballers
Hacettepe S.K. footballers
KF Vllaznia Shkodër players
Expatriate footballers in Turkey
Expatriate footballers in Israel
Expatriate footballers in Albania
Hapoel Be'er Sheva F.C. players
Association football defenders
Real Sportive players
Association football utility players
Sekondi Wise Fighters players
Ghanaian expatriate sportspeople in Turkey
Ghanaian expatriate sportspeople in Israel
Tema Youth players
Süper Lig players
Israeli Premier League players